Pakistani-Greek relations are foreign relations between Pakistan and Greece. Pakistan's first embassy in Athens was opened in 1975.  Greece established an embassy in Islamabad in 1987.

History

Ancient Time

For the ancient Greeks, “India" referred to the polity situated east of Persia and south of the Himalayas (with the exception of Serica). Although, during different periods of history, "India" referred to a much wider or much less extensive place. The Greeks referred to the ancient Indians as "Indói"; the Indians referred to the Greeks as "Yonas (Yavanas)" in reference to the Ionians.

Modern Time

Part of today's Pakistan became part of the Indo-Greek Kingdom, founded by the successors of Alexander the Great.

Today, there are around 60,000 Pakistanis settled in Greece.

Greece supports a successful outcome of the bilateral Indo-Pakistani dialogue and a peaceful resolution of the differences between the two countries, including the dispute over Kashmir.

High level visits 
On 7 February 2022, the Minister of Migration and Asylum, Mr. Notis Mitarachi paid an official visit to Islamabad.

See also 
 Foreign relations of Pakistan
 Foreign relations of Greece
 Pakistanis in Greece
 Kalash people

References

External links 
 Greek Foreign Affairs Ministry about relations with Pakistan
  Greek embassy in Islamabad
 Pakistani embassy in Athens
 Investigation of the Greek ancestry of northern Pakistani ethnic groups using Y chromosomal DNA variation

 
Pakistan
Greece